Liao Hansheng (November 14, 1911 – October 5, 2006) was a Chinese male politician, who served as the vice chairperson of the Standing Committee of the National People's Congress.

References 

1911 births
2006 deaths
Vice Chairpersons of the National People's Congress
Deputy Ministers of National Defense of the People's Republic of China